Millennial Women is a 1978 science fiction anthology, edited by Virginia Kidd, in which all the stories are written by women and have a female character as the primary protagonist. The themes which these stories have in common are those of social science fiction: that which is perceived as alien, the uses of language, careers, familial relationships, sexual politics, social constructions of gender, political freedom and equality.

Contents
 "Prayer for My Daughter" by Marilyn Hacker (prefatory poem)
 "Introduction" by Virginia Kidd
 "No One Said Forever" by Cynthia Felice (short story)
 "The Song of N'Sardi-El" by Diana L. Paxson (short story)
 "Jubilee's Story" by Elizabeth A. Lynn (short story)
 "Mab Gallen Recalled" by Cherry Wilder (short story)
 "Phoenix in the Ashes" by Joan D. Vinge (novelette)
 "The Eye of the Heron" by Ursula K. Le Guin (novella)
 Biographical Notes (not included in all editions).

Awards and nominations
 1979, Locus Award, Best SF Anthology category, 12th place.

Release details
 1978, Millennial Women, edited by Virginia Kidd, U.S., Delacorte Press (Dell Publishing), pp. 305, 1978, hardcover
 1979, Millennial Women, edited by Virginia Kidd, U.S., Dell Publishing, April 1979, softcover
 1980, The Eye of the Heron and Other Stories, edited by Virginia Kidd, UK, Panther Books (Granada Publishing), pp. 251, 5 June 1980, softcover

Footnotes

External links

1978 anthologies
Science fiction anthologies
Feminist science fiction